Pompeo Cannicciari (1670 – 29 December 1744) was an Italian composer.

Biography 
Cannicciari was born in Rome and spent his entire life in the city. He was maestro di cappella from 1694 to 1709 at the Church of the Holy Spirit in Sassia. Cannicciari succeeded Alessandro Scarlatti as chapel master at the Basilica of Saint Mary Major (Santa Maria Maggiore) on 24 March 1709. He was a member of the Congregation of Saint Cecilia and was Guardian of the section of the chapel masters in 1698 and 1715 to 1718. He served in this office until his death. Cannicciari bequeathed his collection of music manuscripts to the Basilica. He was succeeded by his student, Sante Pesci, who had been a member of the choir. Pesci was directed to draw up an inventory of the entire music archive, thus providing historical documentation for the works of Cannicciari.

A composer of solely sacred music, Cannicciari was a representative of the Roman School of music and successor of the style of sacred polyphony of Horace benevolent. He was the author of numerous church works, including some pastoral masses, which occasionally have instrumental accompaniment for voices, but he preferred to devote himself to the production of masses and psalms and polyphony, demonstrating skill in counterpoint.

Compositions
 42 masses
 146 graduals
 120 offertories
 266 antiphons
 179 psalms
 45 hymns
 38 responses
 56 motets

References 
 Translated from the Italian Wikipedia and expanded

External links 

 

17th-century Italian composers
18th-century Italian composers
Italian male composers
1670 births
1744 deaths
Musicians from Rome
17th-century male musicians